KPAN may refer to:

 KPAN (AM), a radio station (860 AM) licensed to Hereford, Texas, United States
 KPAN-FM, a radio station (106.3 FM) licensed to Hereford, Texas
 Payson Municipal Airport in Payson, Arizona (ICAO code KPAN)
 Korean People's Army Navy